Headline Shirts is a San Francisco based online T-shirt company specializing in politically satirical or otherwise humorous graphic themes inspired by current events and popular culture. 

The company was launched in 2004 by Atticus Von, a San Francisco resident and frequent subject of fashion editorials and articles concerning the controversial nature of his unique and subversive aesthetic approach to product design.

See also
Busted Tees
Snorg Tees
T Shirt Hell

References

External links
Official Site

T-shirts
Mission District, San Francisco